Schwackaea is a monotypic genus of flowering plants belonging to the family Melastomataceae. The only species is Schwackaea cupheoides.

Its native range is Southern Mexico to Colombia.

References

Melastomataceae
Melastomataceae genera
Monotypic Myrtales genera
Taxa named by Alfred Cogniaux